"Ab Khel Ke Dikha" was the official anthem of the 2016 Pakistan Super League, the first season of the Pakistan Super League. It was written and sung by Ali Zafar.

Background and release 
The song was produced and recorded by Ali Zafar in his studio when he was approached by the Pakistan Cricket Board (PCB) to create an anthem for the inaugural season of the PSL, running in February 2016. A chorus of 25 male and female singers also joined him as backing vocalists. According to Zafar, due to the international nature of the tournament, "The song has a sort of international feel to it but there is also a very Pakistani flavour. I have kept the melody in such a way that it can be hummed by any listener." It was first performed by Zafar on its release at the PSL's logo launching ceremony in Lahore on 20 September 2015.

The hashtag #AbKhelKeDikha was used on the PSL's social media accounts to promote the tournament.

The music video for the remix of song was released on 4 February 2016 by HBL Pakistan, on audio of which Zafar then also performed in the opening ceremony of PSL season I in Dubai the same evening. He then also performed on reprise of the song in opening ceremony of PSL season II on 9 February 2017 in Dubai.

The melody of this anthem was also played at the end of opening ceremony of 2019 Pakistan Super League.

See also 
List of Pakistan Super League anthems
Ali Zafar discography

References

External links 

2016 Pakistan Super League
2016
2015 songs
Ali Zafar songs